Lawry is a surname. Notable people with the surname include:

 William Morris "Bill" Lawry (born 1937), Australian cricketer
 Frank Lawry (1844–1921), New Zealand politician
 Jo Lawry, Australian singer
 John Lawry (born 1950), musician
 Michael Lawry, New Zealand musician
 Otis Lawry, American baseball player
 Samuel Lawry (1854–1933), New Zealand Methodist minister
 William Lawry (born 1940), English cricketer

See also
Lawry's, a restaurant chain and brand of seasonings
Lawrie, a surname and given name